JS Saoura, an Algerian professional association football club, has gained entry to Confederation of African Football (CAF) competitions on several occasions. They have represented Algeria in the Champions League on two occasions and the Confederation Cup on one occasion.

History
JS Saoura whose team has regularly taken part in Confederation of African Football (CAF) competitions. Qualification for Algerian clubs is determined by a team's performance in its domestic league and cup competitions, JS Saoura is the first club from the south of Algeria to participate in a continental competition, and that was in 2017 in the CAF Champions League as the runner-up of the Ligue Professionnelle 1 and they eliminated in the preliminary round against Enugu Rangers and the first continental goal scored by Abderrahmane Bourdim. Two years later, JS Saoura returned to participate in the same competition, where they qualified for the group stage with Al-Ahly, AS Vita Club and Simba of Tanzania. In the first round, JS Saoura was defeated by Simba 3-0. away from home, then achieved two draws against AS Vita Club and Vita Club, then two victories against Vita Club and Simba, and in the last round, it was defeated against AS Vita Club, ending the group stage in third place with 8 points.

CAF competitions

Non-CAF competitions

Statistics

By season
Information correct as of 15 October 2022.
Key

Pld = Played
W = Games won
D = Games drawn
L = Games lost
F = Goals for
A = Goals against
Grp = Group stage

PR = Preliminary round
R1 = First round
R2 = Second round
SR16 = Second Round of 16
R16 = Round of 16
QF = Quarter-final
SF = Semi-final

Key to colours and symbols:

By competition

In Africa
:

Non-CAF competitions
:

Statistics by country
Statistics correct as of game against SC Gagnoa on October 15, 2022

CAF competitions

Non-CAF competitions

African competitions goals
Statistics correct as of game against SC Gagnoa on October 15, 2022

Two goals one match

Non-CAF competitions goals

List of All-time appearances
This List of All-time appearances for JS Saoura in African competitions contains football players who have played for JS Saoura in African football competitions and have managed to accrue 10 or more appearances.

Gold Still playing competitive football in JS Saoura.

African opponents by cities

Notes

References

Africa
Algerian football clubs in international competitions